Raedersdorf is a commune in the Haut-Rhin department in Alsace in north-eastern France.

Geography 
Raedersdorf is located in the south of the so-called Alsatian jura, a community of communes. French-speaking Switzerland (Lucelle) and German-speaking Switzerland (Rodersdorf) are very close.

Population 

In 2019, the commune had 515 inhabitants, an increase of 2.7% compared to 2014.

See also
 Communes of the Haut-Rhin department

References

Communes of Haut-Rhin